Bermius odontocercus, the Eastern Toothed Bermius, is a species of short-horned grasshopper in the family Acrididae. It is found in Australia. It was first described by Carl Stål  in 1878.

References

External links

 

Oxyinae
Taxa named by Carl Stål
Insects described in 1878